Rickey Smiley For Real is an American reality television series that premiered on November 10, 2015, on TV One. The series follows the life of comedian and radio show host Rickey Smiley as he juggles between his career, fatherhood and personal life, with the two main settings being Birmingham, Alabama (his hometown) and Atlanta, Georgia (where he hosts his syndicated radio show).

"[The show] showcases the ‘real’ Rickey," said D’Angela Proctor, the network's vice president. "We see his real job, real friends, real kids and his really crazy life. As a successful member of our Radio One family, Rickey’s return to TV One is sure to resonate with our audience." Smiley had previously starred on his own scripted series on TV One titled The Rickey Smiley Show.

In April 2016, TV One renewed the series for a second season which premiered on May 10, 2016. On August 13, 2018, TV One renewed the series for a fifth season that premiered on October 30, 2018.

Episodes

Season 1 (201516)

Season 2 (2016)

Season 3 (2016)

Season 4 (2017)

References

External links 
 
 

2010s American reality television series
2015 American television series debuts
English-language television shows
Television shows set in Atlanta
TV One (American TV channel) original programming